The 2018–19 Manhattan Jaspers basketball team represented Manhattan College during the 2018–19 NCAA Division I men's basketball season. The Jaspers, who were led by eighth-year head coach Steve Masiello, played their home games at Draddy Gymnasium in Riverdale, New York as members of the Metro Atlantic Athletic Conference. They finished the 2018–19 season 11–21 overall, 8–10 in MAAC play to finish in seventh place. As the No. 7 seed in the 2019 MAAC tournament, they defeated No. 10 seed Fairfield in the first round 57–53 before falling to No. 2 seed Canisius 65–69OT in the quarterfinals.

Previous season
The Jaspers finished the 2017–18 season 14–17, 9–9 in MAAC play to finish in a tie for fifth place. They lost in the quarterfinals of the MAAC tournament to Iona.

Roster

Schedule and results

|-
!colspan=9 style=| Non-conference regular season

|-
!colspan=9 style=| MAAC regular season

|-
!colspan=9 style=| MAAC tournament

References

Manhattan Jaspers basketball seasons
Manhattan
Manhattan
Manhattan
Manhattan basketball
Manhattan basketball